Aenictus mocsaryi is a species of dark brown army ant found in New Guinea.

References

Dorylinae
Hymenoptera of Asia
Insects described in 1901